The NW Elektromobil is a veteran automobile manufactured by Nesselsdorfer Wagenbau-Fabriks-Gesellschaft A.G. (NW, now known as Tatra) in 1900 and 1901. Only two cars ordered by EAG Prague - Vysočany company were made.

References

Cars of the Czech Republic
Tatra vehicles
Rear-wheel-drive vehicles
Rear-engined vehicles
1900s cars
Vehicles introduced in 1900
NW Elektromobil (1900)